

Solo

The Post Nearly Man (1998), Artful
Pander Panda Panzer (2002), Action Records

Von Südenfed

Albums
Tromatic Reflexxions (2007), Domino

Singles
"Fledermaus Can't Get It" (2007), Domino
"The Rhinohead/Slow Down Ronnie" (2007), Domino

Mark E. Smith and Ed Blaney

Albums
Smith and Blaney (2008), Voiceprint
The Train Part Three (2009), Voiceprint
The Train Part 4 (2019), Cog Sinister

Singles
"Real Good Time Together" (2008), Voiceprint
"Transfusion" (2009), Voiceprint

Collaborations

The Clint Boon Experience
"You Can't Keep a Good Man Down" single (1999)

Coldcut
What's That Noise album (1989) – "I'm in Deep"

Edwyn Collins
I'm Not Following You (1996), Setanta – "Seventies Night"

D.O.S.E. featuring Mark E. Smith
"Plug Myself In" (1996), Coliseum – 2 CDs, 12" vinyl

Ghostigital
Iceland Airwaves '05 V/A album (2005), Iceland Airwaves – "Not Clean" (also released as a single)

Gorillaz

Glitter Freeze "Plastic Beach" (2010), co-writer with Gorillaz.

INCH featuring Mark E. Smith
INCH EP (1999), Regal

Inspiral Carpets feat. Mark E Smith
I Want You (1994), Mute

Jon the Postman
Puerile album – Intro to "Louie Louie"

Long Fin Killie
"Heads of Dead Surfers" single (1995) – "Heads of Dead Surfers"

Mouse on Mars
Wipe That Sound EP (2004), Sonig – "Cut the Gain", "Sound City"
21 Again album (2014) – "21 Again"

Shuttleworth
"England's Heartbeat" (2010) – Shuttleworth feat. Mark E. Smith

Jan St. Werner
Molocular Meditation (2020), Editions Mego - "Molocular Meditation", "Back To Animals", "VS Canceled"

Tackhead
"Dangerous Sex" single (1989) – "Repetition"

References

External links
Discography at the Fall online formerly: The Official Fall Website (1998 – Feb 2006); The Unofficial Fall Website (February 2006 – October 2007)

Smith, Mark E